Mount Fox in Canada may refer to the following mountains:

 Mount Fox (Canadian Rockies)
 Mount Fox (Selkirk Mountains)

See also 
 Mount Terry Fox